Hydrocodone/paracetamol (also known as hydrocodone/acetaminophen) is the combination of the pain medications hydrocodone and paracetamol (acetaminophen). It is used to treat moderate to severe pain. It is taken by mouth.  Recreational use is common in the United States.

Common side effects include dizziness, sleepiness, constipation, and vomiting. Serious side effects include addiction, decreased rate of breathing, low blood pressure, serotonin syndrome, severe allergic reactions, and liver failure. Use during pregnancy may harm the fetus. Use with alcohol is not recommended. Hydrocodone works by binding to the mu-opioid receptor. How paracetamol works is unclear but may involve blocking the creation of prostaglandins.

Hydrocodone/paracetamol was approved for medical use in the United States in 1982. In the United States, it is a schedule II controlled substance. In 2020, it was the sixteenth most commonly prescribed medication in the United States, with more than 30million prescriptions. It is not available in the United Kingdom, though the similar combination codeine/paracetamol (co-codamol) is. It is sold under the brand names Vicodin and Norco among others.

Uses

Medical
Hydrocodone/paracetamol is a fixed-dose combination consisting of the opioid hydrocodone and the non-opioid analgesic paracetamol. It is indicated for relief of moderate to severe pain of acute, chronic, or postoperative types. Hydrocodone/paracetamol comes in oral solution and tablet formulations; however strength of each component may vary. In October 2014, the Drug Enforcement Administration rescheduled hydrocodone combination drugs from schedule III to schedule II due to its risk for misuse, abuse, and diversions.

Recreational
Hydrocodone diversion and recreational use has escalated due to its opioid effects. In 2009 and 2010, hydrocodone was the second most frequently encountered opioid pharmaceutical in drug evidence submitted to U.S. federal, state, and local forensic laboratories as reported by the Drug Enforcement Administration's National Forensic Laboratory Information System (NFLIS) and System to Retrieve Information from Drug Evidence (STRIDE).

Pregnancy and breastfeeding
Prolonged use of hydrocodone/paracetamol during pregnancy can result in neonatal opioid withdrawal syndrome. Hydrocodone/paracetamol passes into breast milk and may harm the baby.

Kidney and liver impairment
Use with caution due to possible risk of toxicity.

Side effects

Most common
 Lightheadedness
 Dizziness
 Euphoria 
 Sedation
 Nausea and vomiting
 Headaches

Less common
 Central nervous system: drowsiness, confusion, lethargy, anxiety, fear, unease, dependence, mood changes, impairment of mental and physical performance
 Gastrointestinal system: constipation
 Genitourinary system: inability to urinate, bladder spasms
 Respiratory depression: decreased rate and effort of breathing
 Hearing impairment, permanent hearing loss
 Dermatological: rash, itching

Black box warning
"Paracetamol has been associated with cases of acute liver failure, at times resulting in liver transplant or death. Most of the cases of liver injury are associated with the use of paracetamol at doses that exceed 4000 milligrams per day, and often involve more than one paracetamol-containing product."

Overdose
Hydrocodone: Respiratory depression, extreme somnolence progressing towards coma, muscle limpness, cold and clammy skin, slow heart rate, low blood pressure, abrupt loss of heart function, and death may occur.

Paracetamol: Liver and kidney failure, low blood sugar coma may occur.

Interactions 

Hydrocodone may demonstrate an enhanced respiratory depressant effect when combined with other sedatives such as other opioids, benzodiazepines, nonbenzodiazepine sedatives, psychotropics, and anticonvulsants.

Concurrent use of paracetamol with alcohol products may increase the risk of acute liver failure.

Monitoring
Laboratory function tests should be used to monitor therapy in people with severe liver or renal disease.

Pharmacology

Hydrocodone
 Mechanism of action: Hydrocodone acts primarily as an agonist at the mu-opioid receptors, but is also a weak agonist against the delta opioid and kappa opioid receptors.
 Absorption/distribution: The oral formulation can be absorbed from the gastrointestinal tract and remain 20–50% bound to plasma proteins. The onset of analgesia is about 20 to 30 minutes with duration of 4 to 8 hours and t1/2 of 3 to 4 hours.
 Metabolism/excretion: It is metabolized to norhydrocodone by cytochrome P450 3A4 and to hydromorphone, also biologically active, by cytochrome P450 2D6. For individuals who have a defect in the gene encoding CYP2D6, the clearance of the drug will be lower and less metabolite such as hydromorphone will be formed; however, the effect on analgesia remains unknown.

Paracetamol
 Mechanism of action: Paracetamol acts to inhibit COX enzyme, which is responsible for prostaglandin synthesis. Prostaglandins increase the perception of pain. Inhibition of prostaglandin production helps to alleviate pain.
 Absorption/distribution: The half-life of oral paracetamol is 1.25 to 3 hours and peak level is reached by 10–60 minutes after ingestion.
 Metabolism/excretion: Paracetamol is metabolized primarily in the liver via glucuronidation and sulfation to mostly non-toxic metabolites and some highly reactive metabolites, which is inactivated by glutathione. 85% of the oral dose is excreted via the kidneys. At high doses, the supply of glutathione cannot meet its demand, thus results in the accumulation of highly reactive compounds leading to liver damage.

Society and culture

Legal status
On 30 June 2009, a U.S. Food and Drug Administration (FDA) advisory panel voted by a narrow margin to advise the FDA to remove Vicodin and another opioid, Percocet, from the market because of "a high likelihood of overdose from prescription narcotics and acetaminophen products". The panel also cited concerns of liver damage from their paracetamol component, which is also the main ingredient in commonly used nonprescription drugs such as Tylenol. Each year, paracetamol overdose is linked to about 400 deaths and 42,000 hospitalizations.

In January 2011, the FDA asked manufacturers of prescription combination products that contain paracetamol to limit the amount of paracetamol to no more than 325 mg in each tablet or capsule within three years. The FDA also required manufacturers on all paracetamol containing products to issue a black box warning indicating the potential risk for severe liver injury and a warning highlighting potential for allergic reactions.

On 22 August 2014, the Drug Enforcement Administration (DEA) announced that all hydrocodone combination products (HCPs) will be rescheduled from Schedule III to Schedule II of the Controlled Substances Act (CSA), effective on 6 October 2014. In 2010, more than 16,000 deaths were attributed to abuse of opioid drugs. Even though there are legitimate medical uses for HCPs, data suggest that a significant number of individuals misuse them.

Popular culture
In May 2017, professional golfer Tiger Woods was arrested by the police for driving under the influence. Woods said that this was due to four prescription drugs that he was taking for a back operation, one of which was Vicodin.

Vicodin is mentioned in songs such as Juice Wrld's "Already Dead" Eminem's "Kill You", Blackbear's "Sniffing Vicodin in Paris", Kendrick Lamar's "A.D.H.D", Future's "Lay Up", Lupe Fiasco's "Mural", Queens of the Stone Age's "Feel Good Hit of the Summer", A Winged Victory for the Sullen's "Steep Hills of Vicodin Tears", Death Grips's "Anne Bonny" and The Wombats' "Give Me a Try". Vicodin use is a central theme in the 2004–2012 medical TV drama House, in which the lead character Dr. Gregory House is addicted to the drug combination.

Brand names
Brand names include Adol, Hycet, Lortab, Lorcet, Norco, and Vicodin among others.

References

External links 
 
 Vicodin U.S. Federal Regulations 

Combination analgesics
Euphoriants
Hepatotoxins
AbbVie brands
Semisynthetic opioids
Wikipedia medicine articles ready to translate